The 2011 season is Oriente Petrolero's 55th competitive season, 35th consecutive season in the Liga de Fútbol Profesional Boliviano, and 56th year in existence as a football club. To see more news about Oriente go to Oriente Petrolero Site Official. This season will only show the Torneo Adecuacion and Copa Libertadores participation.

Season summary
To be written at the end of the season

Key dates
 19.12.2010: Cuffaro Russo is appointed as the new Oriente manager following the departure of first team coach Gustavo Quinteros with his tenure set to commence on 26 December.
 23.12.2010:Lorgio Suarez is allowed to leave Oriente on compassionate grounds. He joins Oriente rivals club Blooming for an undisclosed fee, linking up with former Oriente teammate Sergio Galarza and Wilder Zabala.
 26.12.2010: La Liga fixtures for the 2011 season are announced. Oriente are to open their defence of the La Liga crown at home to La Paz F.C.
 29.12.2010: Schiapparelli signed new deal and stays for 18 month
 18.01.2011: Oriente begin El Torneo Adecuacion season with a resounding 6-0 win over newly change  La Paz F.C.
 26.01.2011: Oriente sign 21-year-old striker Nicolas "Chapa" Fernandez from Argentine club Rosario Central. He will replace former Oriente striker Danilo Peinado who left the club 3 days ago
 04.02.2011: Oriente draw Junior, Peru León de Huánuco and Grêmio in the group stages of Copa Libertadores.

Squads

First team squad
The squad will be announced on February 1st

Torneo Adecuacion squad

Copa Libertadores squad

Transfers

In

Summer

Summer

Loan out

Pre-season

Top scorers
Includes all competitive matches. The list is sorted by shirt number when total goals are equal.

Last updated on 24 January

Disciplinary record
Includes all competitive matches. Players with 1 card or more included only.

Last updated on 23 February 2011

Torneo Adecuacion

Standings

Results summary

Results by round

Copa Libertadores

Oriente looked to improve on their first Copa Libertadores participation since 2006, when they were blasted in the First Stage by Argentine River Plate. By virtue of winning  Torneo Clausura, Oriente automatically qualified for the group stage of the tournament. The draw for the group stage was held on 25 November 2010 in Asunción. Oriente was paired with Liga Postobon Campeonato Apertura champions, Junior as well as 2010 Torneo Descentralizado Runners-up, León de Huánuco . Oriente's first match took place on the 17 February against Gremio.

Group stage

Group 2

References

2011
Oriente Petrolero